"Somewhere Down the Line" is a song written by Lewis Anderson and Casey Kelly, recorded by American country music artist T. G. Sheppard.  It was released in June 1984 as the third single from the album Slow Burn.  The song reached #3 on the Billboard Hot Country Singles & Tracks chart.

Charts

Weekly charts

Year-end charts

References

1984 singles
T. G. Sheppard songs
Songs written by Lewis Anderson
Songs written by Casey Kelly (songwriter)
Song recordings produced by Jim Ed Norman
Warner Records singles
Curb Records singles
1984 songs